Euonymus fortunei, the spindle, Fortune's spindle, winter creeper or wintercreeper, is a species of flowering plant in the family Celastraceae, native to east Asia, including China, Korea, the Philippines and Japan. It is named after the Scottish botanist and plant explorer Robert Fortune. E. fortunei is highly invasive and damaging in the United States, causing the death of trees and forest in urban areas.

Description
It is an evergreen shrub which grows as a vine if provided with support. Like ivy, it also has a sterile non-flowering juvenile climbing or creeping phase, which on reaching high enough into the crowns of trees to get more light, develops into an adult, flowering phase without climbing rootlets.

The leaves are arranged in opposite pairs, elliptic to elliptic-ovate, 2–6 cm long and 1–3 cm broad, with finely serrated margins. The flowers are inconspicuous, 5 mm in diameter, with four small greenish-yellow petals. The fruit is a smooth, dehiscent capsule with reddish arils.

Varieties
There are two or three varieties: 
Euonymus fortunei var. fortunei (syn. var. acutus). China, Korea
Euonymus fortunei var. radicans (Sieb. ex Miq.) Rehd. (syn. E. radicans). Japan
Euonymus fortunei var. vegetus (Rehd.) Rehd. Northern Japan (Hokkaidō), doubtfully distinct from var. radicans (Bean 1973)

Distribution and habitat
It has an extensive native range, including many parts of China (from sea level to 3400 m elevation), India, Indonesia, Japan, Korea, Laos, Myanmar, Philippines, Thailand, and Vietnam.  It resembles Euonymus japonicus, which is also widely cultivated but is a shrub, without climbing roots.  It also is related to a variety of similar species, including Euonymus theifolius, or Euonymus vagans and also a number of named "species" which are found only in cultivation and better treated as cultivars. Its habitats include woodlands, scrub, and forests.

Cultivation
Euonymus fortunei is widely cultivated as an ornamental plant, with numerous cultivars selected for such traits as yellow, variegated and slow, dwarfed growth. It is used as a groundcover or a vine to climb walls and trees. The following cultivars have gained the Royal Horticultural Society's Award of Garden Merit: 
'Emerald Gaiety' 
'Emerald 'n' Gold' 
'Emerald Surprise'
'Kewensis' 
'Wolong Ghost'

Plants propagated from mature flowering stems (formerly sometimes named "f. carrierei") always grow as non-climbing shrubs. Some popular cultivars such as 'Moon Shadow' are shrub forms.

Most of the cultivated plants belong to var. radicans (Huxley 1992). It is generally considered cold hardy in USDA zones 5 to 9, and is considered an invasive species in some parts of the world, notably the eastern United States and Canada.

Gallery

References

External links

Bean, W. J. (1973) Trees and Shrubs hardy in the British Isles 8th ed., vol. 2: 150-151. John Murray.
Huxley, A., ed. (1992) New RHS Dictionary of Gardening vol. 2: 242. Macmillan.
 

fortunei
Flora of China
Flora of Japan
Flora of Korea
Garden plants